Kim Ji-yeol (born August 9, 1988) is a South Korean professional baseball outfielder. He joined the Hanwha Eagles in 2007. After that, he transferred to Nexen Heros in 2013, and he moved to KT Wiz in 2014. He changed his name to Kim Ji-yeol from Kim Sa-yeon (김사연).

References

External links 
 Sa-yeon Kim on Baseball Reference

1988 births
KBO League pitchers
KT Wiz players
Living people